Hans Ivar Åke Eliaeson (26 May 1923 – 24 January 2015) was a Swedish tennis player.

Tennis career
Eliaeson represented the Swedish Davis Cup team in the 1952 Europe Zone second round tie against Chile. He played the last singles rubber in Sweden's 5–0 victory.

Eliaeson played in one Grand Slam tournament, the 1950 US Open, where he lost to Sam Match. Eliaeson won two amateur tournament titles, in 1951 at the Helsinki indoor event and in 1952 in Bad Schwartau, Germany.

See also
List of Sweden Davis Cup team representatives

References

External links
 
 

1923 births
Swedish male tennis players
2015 deaths
People from Lidingö Municipality
Sportspeople from Stockholm County
20th-century Swedish people